The Hungarian Women's Cup is the annual cup competition of women's football teams in Hungary. It was first contested in 1993.

List of finals
The list of finals:

Performance by club

References

External links
Cup at noifoci.com
Cup at women.soccerway.com

Hun
Women
Recurring sporting events established in 1993
Cup